Anna Maria de Bruyn (ca. 1708, Zwolle – buried 28 May 1744, Amsterdam) was a Dutch stage actress and ballet dancer.

She was born to the actors Jan de Bruyn (died 1749), and Elizabeth Bleeck (1684–1751). She was active at the theaters of Amsterdam in 1719–1744. Originally employed with her family, she was given an individual contract in 1727. She was one of the stars of the theatre and was described as "The most beautiful jewel in the theatre's crown".

She died in 1744 during childbirth. She was replaced as lead actress by Elisabeth Mooij.

References 

 Historici 

1708 births
1744 deaths
18th-century Dutch actresses
Dutch ballerinas
Dutch stage actresses
Deaths in childbirth
Actresses from Amsterdam
People from Zwolle
18th-century Dutch ballet dancers